Lance Cole Barrett (born October 3, 1984) is an umpire in Major League Baseball (MLB). He wore number 94 but changed to 16 starting in the 2020 season. Barrett became a minor league umpire in 2003 and was hired to the MLB staff prior to the 2014 season.

Biography
Barrett went to Crowley High School in Crowley, Texas. He attended the Jim Evans Academy of Professional Umpiring immediately after high school. He entered the minor leagues in 2003 and made his MLB debut on October 1, 2010. Barrett's first career ejection came on April 16, 2012, when he threw out Chicago White Sox pitching coach Don Cooper. 

On March 29 and 30, 2013, he umpired two Spring Training games featuring the Texas Rangers and the San Diego Padres. Those were the first baseball games played at the Alamodome.

He worked all 4 games on June 13–16, 2019, between the San Diego Padres and the Colorado Rockies in which both teams set a Major League Record for combined runs in a four-game series (92). The previous record was 88, set in 1929. 

Barrett worked his first career MLB postseason game in left field on October 2, 2019, serving in the 2019 American League Wild Card Game between the Tampa Bay Rays and the Oakland Athletics.

Barrett was the third base umpire for the Baltimore Orioles vs Seattle Mariners game on May 5, 2021 in which John Means threw a no-hitter facing the minimum 27 batters.

See also 

 List of Major League Baseball umpires

References

Major League Baseball umpires
1984 births
Living people
Sportspeople from Fort Worth, Texas